Lieutenant general Luang Kriangsakphichit (personal name Phichit Kriangsakphichit, ; 20 July 1896 – 29 July 1964) was a former army commander in the Franco-Thai War. He also served as Minister of Defence, Minister of Public Health, Member of Parliament, and was a member of Khana Ratsadon.

References

1896 births
1964 deaths
Phichit Kriangsakphichit
Phichit Kriangsakphichit
Phichit Kriangsakphichit
Phichit Kriangsakphichit
Phichit Kriangsakphichit
Phichit Kriangsakphichit
Phichit Kriangsakphichit